Route 217 is a collector road in the Canadian province of Nova Scotia.

It is located in Digby County and connects Westport, Brier Island with Digby at Route 303.

It traverses the Digby Neck peninsula, as well as Long Island and includes short two ferry links, East Ferry to Tiverton and Freeport to Westport.

The road contains many scenic views and is marketed as the "Digby Neck and Islands Scenic Drive" with custom road signs. In summer it is heavily traveled by tourists seeking whale watching tours at the end of Digby Neck.

The western terminus is a look-off in Westport beside the Joshua Slocum monument with a view of Grand Passage and the Peter Island Lighthouse.

Communities
Communities in italics are served by the route indirectly.

Westport (Route 217 includes a short length of the southern half of Water Street in Westport, Brier Island.)
Freeport 
Central Grove
Gilberts Landing
Tiverton
East Ferry
Tiddville
Little River
Mink Cove
Sandy Cove
Lake Midway
Centreville
Waterford
Rossway
Gullivers Cove
Roxville
Seabrook
Digby

History

Highway 217 was formerly designated Trunk Highway 17.

See also
List of Nova Scotia provincial highways

References

External links
Google maps

Nova Scotia provincial highways
Roads in Digby County, Nova Scotia